Acapetlahuaya municipal seat of General Canuto A. Neri Municipality, in the state of Guerrero, south-western Mexico.

Former mayor of Acapetlahuaya, Roger Arellano Sotelo, was murdered on April 9, 2017.

References

Populated places in Guerrero